Fortinbras is the name of two fictional characters in Shakespeare's play Hamlet.

Fortinbras may also refer to:

 Fortinbras (Onimusha), a character from the PlayStation 2 game Onimusha: Warlords
 Fortinbras, the Murry family's dog in the works of Madeleine L'Engle
 Fortinbras (play), a play by Lee Blessing
 Fortinbras Took I & II, two of the Hobbit characters in J. R. R. Tolkien's legendarium